Coscinodiscophycidae or Coscinodiscineae is a grouping of Coscinodiscophyceae, previously known as "Centrales", a paraphyletic order of centric diatoms, a major group of algae and one of the most common members of the phytoplankton.

Description
Valves generally have a marginal ring of processes. They usually have symmetry with no polarities.

See also
Biddulphiineae

References

Coscinodiscophyceae

SAR supergroup suborders